Spot-legged frog may refer to:

 Spot-legged poison frog (Ameerega picta), a frog in the family Dendrobatidae found in Bolivia, Brazil, Peru, and Venezuela
 Spot-legged tree frog (Polypedates megacephalus), a frog in the family Rhacophoridae found in China and Taiwan

Animal common name disambiguation pages